Ivo Pranjković (born 17 August 1947) is a Croatian linguist.

Pranjković is a Bosnian Croat, born in Kotor Varoš in Bosnia and Herzegovina. After the classical secondary school in Visoko, he received a BA degree in Croatian from the Faculty of Humanities and Social Sciences at the University of Zagreb. In 1974 he became a member of the Department of Croatian at the same faculty. Today, he is a professor of standard Croatian.

As a learned linguist and philologist with a wide spectrum of interests, Pranjković made important contributions to several linguistic areas. His syntactic studies Croatian Syntax, Second Croatian Syntax and Croatian grammar (published in co-authorship with Josip Silić) are generally considered important works for the modern Croatian syntax. Other areas of his work are general linguistics, history of Croatian philology in the 19th and early 20th centuries, and the linguistic heritage of Bosnian Franciscans. This last topic was the subject of several studies of Pranjković, as well as the book Hrvatski jezik i franjevci Bosne Srebrene (Croatian and the Bosnian Franciscans), where he described the linguistic area which was crucial for the development and standardization of Croatian, but which was greatly neglected until his work.

Aside from linguistic theory and history, Pranjković engaged in many disputes and comments in the press, especially with his great rival, Stjepan Babić. His articles have been collected in several books. Pranjković has polemicized with virtually every Croatian linguist of the older generation. He has criticized their prescriptive approaches to language. However, French linguist Paul-Louis Thomas and Croatian linguist Snježana Kordić have described and criticized puristic and prescriptive tendencies even in Pranjković’s publications.

As a versatile linguist, Pranjković made important contributions to stylistics.

Works
August Musić, 1989
Adolfo Veber Tkalčević, 1993
Kronika hrvatskoga jezikoslovlja (Chronology of Croatian Linguistics), 1993
Hrvatska skladnja (Croatian Syntax), 1993
Lingvistički komentari (Linguistic Comments), 1997
Jezikoslovna sporenja (Linguistic Disputes), 1997
Hrvatski jezik i franjevci Bosne Srebrene (Croatian and the Bosnian Franciscans), 2000 
Druga hrvatska skladnja (Second Croatian Syntax), 2001
Jezik i beletristika (Language and Belles Lettres), 2003
Gramatika hrvatskoga jezika (Croatian Grammar), co-author, 2006
Sučeljavanja: Polemički dueli oko hrvatskoga jezika i pravopisa, 2008
Ogledi o jezičnoj pravilnosti, 2010

References

1947 births
Living people
People from Kotor Varoš
Linguists from Bosnia and Herzegovina
Linguists from Croatia
Croats of Bosnia and Herzegovina
Faculty of Humanities and Social Sciences, University of Zagreb alumni
Academic staff of the University of Zagreb